Suncroft is a village in County Kildare, Ireland, south of The Curragh and east of Kildare Town. As of 2016, Suncroft had a population of 746.

Name
The name Suncroft means "a sun blessed croft". According to local folklore, Suncroft was named by a priest who was walking in the croft (or field), and the sun was shining so brightly on the field that he decided to name the place Suncroft.

Education
The primary school in the town is Suncroft National School (in Irish Scoil Bhride, Crochta na Gréine).

Transport
Bus Éireann route 126 serves the village once a day in each direction (not Sundays) providing a link to/from Kildare, Newbridge, Naas and Dublin. The nearest railway stations are Kildare railway station and Newbridge railway station.

Sport
Suncroft A.F.C. is the local football club, and Suncroft GAA is the local Gaelic Athletic Association club.

See also
List of towns and villages in Ireland

References

Towns and villages in County Kildare